Paul Camboué (22 April 1849 – July 1929) was a French Jesuit priest, arachnologist, and entomologist.

Life
Camboué was born in Mont-de-Marsan, France on 22 April 1849, and studied at the College of St. Joseph in Bordeaux at a middle school run by the Jesuits of Tivoli. He received his baccalaureate in science at the age of 16, and became a lawyer at the appellate court in Paris after getting a law degree. He served as a lieutenant in the Franco-Prussian War. In October 1872, he joined the novitiate of the Jesuits of Toulouse and was ordained in 1881.

He arrived in Madagascar on 10 November 1882, the place where he stayed for much of his life. He was a missionary, and worked in Arivonimamo and Ambohibeloma. He also became interested in Malagasy culture. He penned the article on "Madagascar" for the Catholic Encyclopedia. He was procurator in France of the Malagasy mission, and professor of the Malagasy language at the Catholic Institute in Paris.

He was involved in extracting spider silk; the Magasin Pittoresque commented that "Various attempts have been made at different times to utilize the thread of the spider, but to Father Camboné, a French missionary to Madagascar, is due the credit of having first brought these attempts to a successful issue".

Camboué became an associate member of the Malagasy Academy on 12 November 1903 and a titular member on 29 June 1927. He was a corresponding member of the Académie des Sciences. For his scientific work, he received the Savigny prize in 1870, the Duseigneur-Kléber prize of the Lyons Chamber of Commerce, and the Saintour prize of the Académie des Sciences on 22 December 1924.

Alfred Grandidier's report to the Académie des Sciences prepared for the awarding of the Savigny prize described his scientific work; an excerpt is provided below:

Paul Camboué died in Madagascar in July 1929.

References 

French Jesuits
French arachnologists
French entomologists
People from Mont-de-Marsan
1849 births
1929 deaths
Contributors to the Catholic Encyclopedia